The Circus is an extended play by American rapper Mick Jenkins. It was released on January 10, 2020 via Free Nation/Cinematic Music Group. Composed of seven tracks, production was handled by eleven record producers, including Black Milk and Hit-Boy. It features a guest appearance from Atlanta-based hip hop duo EarthGang.

Singles and promotion
On January 3, 2020, "Carefree" produced by Black Milk was released, supported by a music video, as he announced the EP.

Critical reception

The Circus received generally positive reviews from critics. At Metacritic, which assigns a normalized rating out of 100 to reviews from mainstream publications, the album received an average score of 78, based on 5 reviews.

Track listing

References 

2020 EPs
Albums produced by Hit-Boy
Mick Jenkins (rapper) albums
Albums produced by Beat Butcha
Albums produced by Black Milk